Luigi Viviani (born 1937) is an Italian politician.

Luigi Viviani may also refer to:

 Luigi Viviani (composer), 19th-century opera composer
 Luigi Viviani (marchese), 17th-century marchese, counselor of Cosimo III de' Medici, Grand Duke of Tuscany
 Luigi Viviani (soldier) (1903–1943), Italian engineer and soldier